Shangri-La is a fictional valley in the 1933 novel Lost Horizon by James Hilton.

Shangri-La may also refer to:

Buildings
Shangri La (Doris Duke), a mansion built by Doris Duke outside Honolulu, Hawaii
Shangri-La (house), a Denver, Colorado, mansion built by Harry E. Huffman
Hotel Shangri-La, a hotel in Santa Monica, California
Living Shangri-La, a skyscraper in Vancouver
The St. Francis Shangri-La Place, a condominium in Mandaluyong, Philippines
Shangri-La Hotels and Resorts
Edsa Shangri-La, Manila, Mandaluyong, Philippines
Makati Shangri-La, Manila, Makati, Philippines
Shangrila Resort, on Lower Kachura Lake, Skardu, Gilgit−Baltistan, Pakistan
Shangri-La Hotel (Dubai), a hotel on the Sheikh Zayed Road, Dubai
Shangri-La Hotel Singapore
Shangri-La Colombo, Sri Lanka
Shangri-la Plaza, the retail arm of the Kuok group
Shangri-La Toronto, a hotel/condominium under construction in Toronto

Music
The Shangri-Las, an American girl group of the 1960s

Albums
 Shangri-La (BeForU album) (2008) or its title song
 Shangri-La (The Blackeyed Susans album) (2003)
 Shangri-La (Elkie Brooks album) (2003)
 Shangri La (Jake Bugg album) (2013)
 Shangri-La (Mark Knopfler album) (2004)
 Shangri-La (Mucc album) (2012)
 Shangri'la (Rubettes album) (1992)
 Shangri-La (Sonny Stitt album) (1964)
 Shangri-La (EP), by VIXX (2017) or the title track
 Shangri-La (Leehom Wang album) (2004)
 Shangri-La (Yacht album) (2011)
 Shangri-La, by Bardeux (1990)

Songs 
"Shangri-La", by Sylvie Kreusch, 2021
"Shangri-La" (1946 song), popularized by The Four Coins in 1957 and The Lettermen in 1969
"Shangri-La" (Chatmonchy song), 2006
"Shangri-La" (Denki Groove song), 1997
"Shangri-La" (Gerard Joling song), the Dutch entry to the Eurovision Song Contest 1988
"Shangri-La" (The Kinks song), 1969
"Shangri La", by A*Teens from New Arrival
"Shangri La", by Angela and the opening theme of Fafner in the Azure
"Shangri-La", by Lola Blanc from an upcoming album
"Shangri-La", by Digitalism from the album Mirage
"Shangri-La", by Electric Light Orchestra from A New World Record
"Shangri-La", by Gotthard from Need to Believe
"Shangri La", song by Roman Grey
"Shangri-La", by Don Henley from The End of the Innocence
"Shangrila", by Billy Idol from Cyberpunk, 1993
"Shangri-La", by The Rutles from The Rutles Archaeology
"Shangri-La", by Steve Miller Band from Italian X Rays
"Shangri-La", by Versus, from the album Hurrah and the Shangri-La EP
"Shangri-La", by Kim Wilde from the album Teases & Dares
"Shangri-La", by Diaura from the album Versus

Record labels
 Shangri-La Music, a Santa Monica-based record label
 Shangri-La Records, a Memphis-based record label

Places
Shangrila Lake, formally named Lower Kachura Lake, a lake near Skardu in Gilgit−Baltistan, Pakistan
Shangri-la (Antarctica), a valley in the McMurdo Dry Valleys of Antarctica
Shangri-La City, a county-level city in Yunnan province, China
Shangri-La (Xianggelila) Town, formerly called Riwa, a town in Daocheng County, Garzê Tibetan Autonomous Prefecture, Sichuan 
Shangri-La Speedway, a race track in the state of New York (United States)
Xangri-lá, a coastal city in Rio Grande do Sul state, Brazil
Shangrilá, a former seaside resort in Uruguay
Shangri La Botanical Gardens and Nature Center, a botanical garden in the United States
Camp David or Shangri-La
Baliem Valley, a valley in Papua which became famous after the 1945 New Guinea Gremlin Special rescue
Shangri-La, a popular live music and late-night area located in the south-east corner of the Glastonbury Festival site

Other uses
Shangri-La (film), a 2002 film by Takashi Miike
Shangri-La (musical), a 1956 musical stage adaptation of the Hilton novel
Shangri-La (novel), a 2009 Japanese novel adapted into a manga and an anime series
Shangri-La Frontier, a 2020 web novel adapted into a manga
Shangri-la (Titan), a region on Saturn's main satellite, Titan
Shangri-la Plaza (TV pilot), an American musical-comedy pilot 
USS Shangri-La (CV-38), an aircraft carrier of World War II
Shangri-La Dialogue, an inter-government security forum for Asia-Pacific states
Shangri-La Entertainment, an American production company
Lost in Shangri-La, a 2011 non-fiction book by Mitchell Zuckoff
Shangri-La (recording studio), a recording studio in Malibu, California
Shangri-La (miniseries), a 2019 miniseries about the recording studio of the same name
The Shangri-La Diet, a 2006 book by Seth Roberts.
”Shangri-La” (level), a map from the zombies mode on Call of Duty: Black Ops
Shangri-La, a mystical dreamland where players battle demons in Far Cry 4

See also
Shambala (disambiguation)
Xanadu (disambiguation)